The 1928 Illinois lieutenant gubernatorial election was held on November 6, 1928. Incumbent Republican liuetenant governor Fred E. Sterling was reelected to a third consecutive term.

Primary elections
Primary elections were held on April 10, 1928.

Democratic primary

Candidates
Peter A. Waller, Democratic nominee for U.S. Senate in 1920

Results

Republican primary

Candidates
Theodore D. Smith
Fred E. Sterling, incumbent Lieutenant Governor

Results

Independent Republican primary

Candidates
Theodore D. Smith
Fred E. Sterling, incumbent Lieutenant Governor

Results

General election

Major candidates
Peter A. Waller, Democratic
Fred E. Sterling, Republican

Minor candidates
William R. Snow, Socialist
F. W. Shimbaugh, Socialist Labor
William Luigge, Workers Party of America

Results

See also
1928 Illinois gubernatorial election

References

Bibliography

1928
lieutenant gubernatorial
Illinois
November 1928 events in the United States